Carabus biroi is a species of ground beetle in the large genus Carabus that is endemic in Turkey.

References

Taxa named by Ernő Csíki

biroi
Insects described in 1927
Insects of Turkey